Trachysalambria is a genus of prawns, containing ten species. It was erected in 1934 by Martin Burkenroad,  as a subgenus of Trachypenaeus, with T. curvirostris as its type species. That subgenus was elevated to the rank of genus in 1997 by Isabel Pérez Farfante and Brian Kensley. The ten species are:
Trachysalambria albicoma (Hayashi & Toriyama, 1980)
Trachysalambria aspera (Alcock, 1905)
Trachysalambria brevisuturae (Burkenroad, 1934)
Trachysalambria curvirostris (Stimpson, 1860)
Trachysalambria fulva (Dall, 1957)
Trachysalambria longipes (Paul'son, 1875)
Trachysalambria malaiana (Balss, 1933)
Trachysalambria nansei Sakaji & Hayashi, 2003
Trachysalambria starobogatovi (Ivanov & Hassan, 1976)
Trachysalambria villaluzi (Muthu & Motoh, 1979)

References

Penaeidae